Kerygmachela kierkegaardi is a gilled lobopodian from the Cambrian Stage 3 aged Sirius Passet Lagerstätte in northern Greenland. Its anatomy strongly suggests that it, along with its relative Pambdelurion whittingtoni, was a close relative of radiodont (anomalocaridids) and euarthropods. The generic name "Kerygmachela" derives from the Greek words Kerygma (proclamation) and Chela (claw), in reference to the flamboyant frontal appendages. The specific name, "kierkegaardi" honors Danish philosopher Søren Kierkegaard.

Morphology 

The head of Kerygmachela possesses a pair of well-developed frontal appendages which correspond to those of other dinocaridids and siberiid lobopodians. Each of them terminates in a series of long spines. A pair of sessile, slit-like compound eyes is located slightly behind the base of these appendages. A small anterior-facing mouth is located below the head and bears a pair of stylet-like structures. The head also possesses a median lobe-like projection that carries a pair of small, possible ocular structures. The body is composed of 11 segments, each indicated by 4 dorsal turberculates associated with 11 pairs of lateral flaps with dorsal gill-like structures, along with 11 pairs of small legs (lobopods) located just below the flaps. The body ends with a single tail spine that was formerly thought to be a pair of cerci. 

Internally, Kerygmachela possesses a well-developed pharynx and a midgut with 8 pairs of arthropod-like digestive glands. The brain is composed of only protocerebrum (the frontal-most cerebral ganglion) with ramified nerves extended to the median lobe, frontal appendages and eyes.

Paleoecology 
The spiny frontal appendages suggests that Kerygmachela may have been a predator; however, fossils indicate a total size of approximately 175 mm and, with a relatively small mouth, suggest that it would have been restricted to very small prey.

References

Further reading

External links 
 Anomalocarid Homepage 
 Palaeos - 

Dinocarida
Prehistoric arthropod genera
Cambrian arthropods
Cambrian Greenland
Fossils of Greenland
Sirius Passet fossils
Buen Formation
Fossil taxa described in 1993
Søren Kierkegaard

Cambrian genus extinctions